The 2006 Major League Baseball season ended with the National League's St. Louis Cardinals winning the World Series with the lowest regular-season victory total (83) in a fully-played season in major league history. The Atlanta Braves failed to qualify for the postseason for the first time since 1990. Individual achievements included Barry Bonds who, despite questions surrounding his alleged steroid use and involvement in the BALCO scandal, surpassed Babe Ruth for second place on the career home runs list. The American League continued its domination at the All-Star Game by winning its fourth straight game, and ninth of the prior 10 contests (the 2002 game was a tie).

Standings

American League

National League

Postseason

Bracket

All-Star game
All-Star Game, July 11 at PNC Park – American League, 3–2; Michael Young, MVP
Century 21 Home Run Derby, July 10 – Ryan Howard, Philadelphia Phillies

Awards

Other awards
Comeback Players of the Year: Jim Thome (Designated hitter, CHW, American); Nomar Garciaparra (First baseman, LAD, National).
Edgar Martínez Award (Best designated hitter): David Ortiz (BOS)
Hank Aaron Award: Derek Jeter (NYY, American); Ryan Howard (PHI, National).
Roberto Clemente Award (Humanitarian): Carlos Delgado (NYM).
Rolaids Relief Man Award: Francisco Rodríguez (LAA, American); Trevor Hoffman (SD, National).
Delivery Man of the Year (Best Reliever): Mariano Rivera (NYY).
Warren Spahn Award (Best left-handed pitcher): Johan Santana (MIN)

Player of the Month

Pitcher of the Month

Rookie of the Month

Statistical leaders

Managers

American League

National League

±hosted the MLB All Star Game

Milestones

300–300 Club members
 Reggie Sanders — June 10
 Steve Finley — June 14

Home Runs
The following players reached major home run milestones in 2006:

Barry Bonds' countdown to 715
 May 21 — reached 714 career homers, tying Babe Ruth for second all time
 May 28 — reached 715 career homers, passing Ruth for second all time

400 career homers
 Mike Piazza — April 26
 Carlos Delgado — August 22

300 career homers
 Jeromy Burnitz — April 4
 Moisés Alou — April 13
 Reggie Sanders — June 10 (also joining the 300–300 club)
 Steve Finley — June 14 (also joining the 300–300 club)

200 career homers
 Jeff Conine — April 16
 Magglio Ordóñez — April 29
 Eric Chavez — May 2
 Jermaine Dye — May 14
 Carlos Lee — May 24
 Phil Nevin — June 19
 Lance Berkman — June 21
 Carl Everett — June 21
 Nomar Garciaparra — June 25
 David Ortiz — June 29
 Alfonso Soriano — August 13
 Bobby Abreu — August 22
 Carlos Beltrán — August 26

Entry into the top 500
 Trot Nixon on April 5 with his 126th career homer
 Jason Varitek on June 13 with his 126th career homer
 Vernon Wells on June 14 with his 126th career homer
 Aubrey Huff on July 1 with his 126th career homer
 Raúl Ibañez on July 15 with his 126th career homer
 Mark Teixeira on August 19 with his 127th career homer

Pitching
 Trevor Hoffman of the San Diego Padres broke Lee Smith's record of 478 Saves on September 24, 2006 at Petco Park.

Hitting
 Alfonso Soriano of the Washington Nationals become only the fourth player to join the 40–40 club, joining José Canseco, Barry Bonds, and Alex Rodriguez when he stole his 40th base of the season on September 16. Six days later he became the first person ever to reach 40 home runs, 40 stolen bases and 40 doubles in one season.

Other achievements

Home Field Attendance & Payroll

Events
April 3 – The Florida Marlins set a modern major-league record by starting six rookies in their opening day 1-0 loss to the Houston Astros.

See also
2006 Nippon Professional Baseball season
2006 in baseball

References

External links
 2006 Major League Baseball season schedule at Baseball Reference

 
Major League Baseball seasons